Lesbian, gay, bisexual, and transgender (LGBT) persons in Benin face legal challenges not experienced by non-LGBT residents. Although same-sex sexual acts for both men and women are legal in Benin, homosexuals continue to face widespread persecution and are rarely open about their sexuality. They are also considered by many as deviants to the society, and homosexuality is often called a disease brought by white people to the country. LGBT persons additionally face stigmatization among the broader population.

Law regarding same-sex sexual activity
Same-sex sexual acts are legal in Benin between consenting adults over the age of 21. The penal code in force in Benin is actually the Penal Code of French West Africa adopted by French colonial decree on 6 May 1877. A 1947 amendment to the Penal Code of 1877 fixed a general age limit of 13 for sex with a child of either gender, but penalized any act that is indecent or against nature if committed with a person of the same sex under 21: "Without prejudice to more severe penalties prescribed by the paragraphs that precede or by Articles 332 and 333 of this Code, shall be punished with imprisonment from six months to three years and a fine of 200 to 50,000 francs anyone who commits an indecent act or [an act] against nature with a minor...of the same sex under 21 years old."

Article 88 of the 1996 draft Penal Code of Benin read "Anyone who commits an indecent act or an act against nature with an individual of the same sex will be punished by 1 to 3 years imprisonment and a fine of 100,000 to 500,000 francs." This draft, however, was never voted into law.

In response to its 2008 UNHRC Universal Periodic Review, the representative of Benin stated, "[regarding the] issue of homosexuality, the phenomenon is not ignored but is marginal. Families would never allow their children to be taken to court for such an offense, so no criminal ruling has ever been rendered, although it is provided for by law." But this official response is inaccurate because the National Assembly of Benin took up revising the penal code in 1996, 2001, 2008, and 2010 but has not yet codified a contemporary penal code addressing same-sex relations. Thus, the only law in effect regarding same-sex relations is from 1949, which sets an unequal age of consent for heterosexual and homosexual sexual relations.

On 4 March 2013 the French ambassador invited the Beninese Minister of Justice to a meeting to discuss Benin's official response to its 2012 UNHRC Universal Periodic Review. Benin had rejected recommendations from states calling on Benin to improve the situation for LGBT persons. But at the 4 March meeting, the Minister turned to her Deputy Director who subsequently said "certain things would be rectified."

Among the more recently proposed laws regarding same-sex sexual activity is a draft penal code from October 2008, which has not yet been voted on. Unlike the 1996 draft, the 2008 draft of the Penal Code includes no reference to punishment for same-sex sexual relations between consenting adults in private:

"SECTION IV: MORAL OFFENSES

"Paragraph 1: Public outrage from assaults on decency

"Article 542: Any person who commits an affront on public decency shall be punished by imprisonment of three months to two years and a fine of fifty thousand to two hundred and fifty thousand francs.

"Article 543: Any indecent offense, committed or attempted without violence or coercion, or surprise on the person of a minor under fifteen years of age, shall be punished with imprisonment of three to five years and a fine of fifty thousand francs to two hundred and fifty thousand francs or one of these penalties.

"Notwithstanding the heavier penalties provided in the preceding paragraph or Article 545 of this Code, shall be punished by imprisonment of six months to three years and a fine of fifty thousand to two hundred and fifty thousand francs anyone commits an indecent act or act against nature with an individual child of the same sex.

"However, indecent assault on a minor of fifteen years shall be punished by imprisonment of five to ten years and a fine of twenty thousand francs to one million francs or one of these two penalties only when it has been committed or attempted either with violence, coercion or surprise, or by legitimate, natural or adoptive guardian of the victim or by a person having control over him or her, or by two or more authors or accomplices or even by a person who has abused the authority conferred by his functions."

Recognition of same-sex relationships
There is no recognition of legal rights for same-sex couples.

The government has recognized the same-sex relationships of members of the diplomatic corps attached to Benin by granting diplomatic visas and diplomatic immunity to the same-sex partners of foreign diplomats in Benin.

Discrimination protections
There is no legal protection against discrimination based on sexual orientation or gender identity, although Article 36 of the Beninese Constitution says "Each Beninese has the duty to respect and to consider his own kin without any discrimination; and to keep relations with others that shall permit the safeguarding, the reinforcement and promotion of respect, dialogue and reciprocal tolerance with a view to peace and to national cohesion."

Living conditions
At the beginning of 2013 there were approximately nine LGBT Beninese associations functioning in Cotonou, Porto Novo, and Parakou. Among the organizations are Bénin Synergie Plus (BESYP); l’Union pour la Solidarité, l’Entraide et le Développement (USED); les Amis de Sans Voix; Swallow (the bird) Club of Benin; et Tous Nés Libres et Egaux.

The U.S. Department of State's 2012 Human Rights Report found that, "There were no reports of criminal cases involving homosexuality. There were no reports of societal discrimination or violence based on a person's sexual orientation."

However, the US State Department's report is gravely incomplete. LGBT residents in Benin who are open about their sexual orientation face discrimination, harassment, violence, and extortion: 
 Despite no evidence against him other than a friend responding affirmatively to a police officer's question regarding his homosexuality, one foreigner spent two months in a Beninese jail in 2006 awaiting trial for fabricated charges likely concerning outrage against public decency based on his homosexuality. He was luckily relatively quickly granted bail of 700.000 F, but has heard nothing since and his case could be reopened any day.
 A transgender Beninese woman in Parakou was attacked in the first decade of the 2000s with a knife and has extensive scars on her arm.
 Hirondelle Club Bénin, an LGBT association created in March 2013 and based in Cotonou, has documented as of April 2013 15 homeless adolescents who have been kicked out of their homes because of their sexual orientation.

On 17 May 2013 the LGBT associations of Cotonou organized a public event in support of the International Day Against Homophobia, Biphobia and Transphobia at the Institut Français of Cotonou that drew a diverse audience of 200 people. Maybe for the first time an open debate brought Beninese to express their support for and questions and concerns about homosexuality in Benin. Several people openly identified as gay, and several more as homophobic.

The Facebook page, Tous Nés Libres et Egaux, was created to promote tolerance of human diversity and the eradication of all forms of discrimination in Benin, especially homophobia.

Summary table

See also

Human rights in Benin
LGBT rights in Africa
Human rights in Africa

References

External links
The Pink Shadows of Benin

LGBT in Benin
Benin
Human rights in Benin
Law of Benin
Politics of Benin